Golspie High School is a secondary school in Golspie, in Sutherland in the north of Scotland.

The school is attended by around 243 pupils. Pupils are from a catchment area that is particularly vast, stretching as far north as Kinbrace, as far south as the Mound and as far west as Rosehall.
Before the opening of Kinlochbervie High School in 1995, pupils attended Golspie as weekly boarders. Golspie High is part of the Golspie, Invergordon & Tain associated school group.

Feeder schools
Primary schools in Brora, Golspie, Helmsdale, Lairg, Rogart, and Rosehall send pupils to Golspie.

Notable former pupils

 Jimmy Yuill actor
 Lewis Williamson racing driver
 Alexander 'Zander' Sutherland footballer

References

External links
 Golspie High School page at Highland Council

Secondary schools in Sutherland
Educational institutions established in 1963
1963 establishments in Scotland
Golspie